Luis Alberto Vera Díaz (born 1 November 1943) is a Uruguayan former footballer who played as a forward. He played in six matches for the Uruguay national football team in 1967. He was also part of Uruguay's squad for the 1967 South American Championship.

References

External links
 

1943 births
Living people
Uruguayan footballers
Uruguay international footballers
Place of birth missing (living people)
Association football forwards